Damien Nettles disappeared from Cowes on the Isle of Wight on 2 November 1996 at the age of 16 during a night out with a friend. Nothing has been seen of him since. The investigation into his disappearance has been ongoing ever since, with five men arrested in 2011, although no charges have been brought.

Background 
Damien Nettles was born June 21, 1980, to parents Valerie and Edward. He has a sister named Sarah. At the time of his disappearance he was roughly 6' 4" in height. He loved the rock band Nirvana and was often seen wearing his Doc Martens boots.

Disappearance 

On the night of his disappearance, Nettles was wearing blue jeans and a black fleece. It was believed that he had not taken a bag of any kind or any personal belongings with him from home. Nettles planned to go to a party with his friend, Chris Boon, who lived in East Cowes, so his father, Ed, gave him a lift there.

The night started with Nettles and Chris attending the party and, after spending some time there, they left to purchase some cider. Nettles was, however, seen leaving the party carrying a black camera, which has never been found. Nettles then journeyed back over to West Cowes via the ferry with Chris. Once back in West Cowes, Nettles entered Yorkies, the High Street fish and chip shop, but left without ordering anything. They then made attempts to get into pubs, but their efforts failed. This caused the two friends to part ways for the night at Northwood Park, with Chris heading home. Nettles then went back to the High Street, purchased chips from Yorkies and was later seen staggering about till just after midnight.

A witness remembers that Nettles was attempting to open the car doors of a blue Ford Fiesta. This person recalls it being somewhere around 23:15 and claims it took place in the Harbour Lights pub car park. After this, another witness placed Nettles at a bus stop near one of The Co-operative Group supermarkets. He entered a bus here, but exited shortly after talking to the driver. It was alleged that he had tried to take the driver's picture with the camera he had on him. He was said to have thanked the driver at the time of exiting the bus. A third witness was waiting in their car for their child to be dropped off by a different bus. Whilst waiting, they claim a person matching Nettles description was eating chips, nestled together with his arms and legs close to his body. The witness then claims the figure approached him, saying “They are watching us”, before clearing rain off the car window and walking off towards the High Street.

Investigation
Numerous people who witnessed Nettles on the night of his disappearance alleged he looked as though he could’ve been heavily drunk and possibly somewhat confused.  Another allegation was made that a drug dealer by the name of Bunny Iles had sold drugs to Nettles.  A previous girlfriend of Nettles, Abbie Scott, revealed she believed there were some aspects of his life he was keeping secret, and went on to say it could have involved drugs, although she wasn’t entirely sure. However, it wasn't possible to completely verify all witness statements from the night of Nettles’ disappearance, as some of the CCTV footage from the High Street that could've featured him, was claimed to be lost by police.

As of 2011, eight arrests for conspiracy to murder had been made by Hampshire Constabulary. All these people were released and nobody was charged. On 1 November 2011 two arrests were made in Cowes on suspicion of conspiring to murder after the police received information. The suspects were a man, aged 44 and a woman, aged 35. They were both questioned whilst in custody and linked to an address in Marsh Road, Gurnard, Isle of Wight, which was searched by police in the hopes of finding Nettles, or any evidence related to the case. Prior to this, in May 2011, five arrests had been made on suspicion of murder. These included a man from Sandown, Isle of Wight, aged 48, a person from Cowes, aged 45, a person from Newport, Isle of Wight, aged 50, a person from Ryde, aged 37 and a person from Gravesend, Kent, aged 40.  All were released on bail. A sixth arrest was also made in July 2011, a man from East Cowes, aged 38. He was also released. As of 4th October 2013, a £20,000 reward was on offer from Hampshire Constabulary for 6 months. Despite receiving 30 accounts of information during this period, the authorities were still no closer to solving the mystery of Nettles’ whereabouts. Regardless of the family’s pleas, the reward wasn’t extended.

On 25 July 2016, a BBC Three series, Unsolved: The Boy Who Disappeared, was broadcast about the case.

Nettles’ family became aware their son may have been captured on CCTV whilst on the High Street in Cowes, so they sought out the owners of the cameras, which belonged to a local organisation. After the authorities were notified, Nettles was pinpointed on the footage. But after it was viewed by Nettles’ mother, she informed police the person in the film they believed to be her son, was in fact not him. She did however locate her son on the film, which caught Nettles’ last movements, in which he could be seen alone, eating his chips, walking along the empty street just after midnight. This was the last moment on film that Nettles’ mother ever saw her son alive. After a period of time, this footage was lost by police. A complaint was made by Nettles’ mother to the Independent Police Complaints Commission in 2005 regarding this loss and the way her son’s case had been dealt with. She received a response in which she was advised that the incident concerning the officer responsible for the lost tapes had previously been acted upon.

It has been claimed that Nettles’ mother has conveyed how disheartened she’d found herself, because of the police’s management of the case. Evidence ended up being mislaid, along with records failing to be kept, resulting in any possible progression of the case being hindered. The call log made to police on the night of Nettles’ disappearance no longer exists, and the records detailing which officers were on duty that night were lost. However, the case remains open. Other criticisms towards the handling of the investigation include requests made to commence searches both on land and from the air, being rejected, and the error made by police who initially listed Nettles as a missing adult rather than a missing child. Members of the public campaigned by protesting and participating in a march. Their aim was to convince police to dig at Parkhurst Forest and Gurnard, as claims were made that Nettles’ remains may be buried there. However, police declined this request, as they believed the claims made to them came from untrustworthy sources.  

Theories emerged that Nettles fell into the sea following his night out, but his mother dismisses these assumptions. She is convinced he suffered at the hands of a drugs gang. She revealed that in spite of Cowes’s upscale reputation, there are people there associated in supplying others with drugs.  

In March 2002, Hampshire Constabulary’s major crime department was passed the case, and details of the investigation were entered on to the Holmes computer system. It was at this point that an informant, who in the 1990’s was connected to a local drug dealer named Nicky McNamara, alleged he told police what happened to Nettles. In 2010, the informant approached Nettles’ mother as he felt no action had been taken regarding his claims. She was told by the informant that McNamara was angered by Nettles whilst they were arguing about drugs, which resulted in McNamara unintentionally giving Nettles a fatal punch. The informant claimed Nettles’ body was concealed for three weeks in a drug den, then later buried in Cowes. The police investigated, arranged searches and made arrests after Nettles’ mother took the information to them, but they concluded that the informant couldn’t be trusted. 

Various other rumours have transpired over the years, but the one involving McNamara is one that has persisted. McNamara died in 2002 of a heroin overdose, and it was then that rumours surfaced suggesting he was involved. It was claimed that McNamara made a deathbed confession regarding his involvement in Nettles' disappearance. 

In spite of the many investigations conducted, plenty of campaigning, and production of documentaries seeking a resolution, Nettles’ whereabouts still remains a mystery.

See also
List of people who disappeared
Disappearance of Luke Durbin

References

1990s missing person cases
1996 in England
20th century on the Isle of Wight
Missing English children
Missing person cases in England
Incidents of violence against boys